Calvin John Ward (October 30, 1899 – December 15, 1967), was a soldier in the United States Army National Guard who was awarded the Medal of Honor for his actions during World War I.

Biography
Calvin John Ward was born on October 30, 1899, in Greene County, Tennessee and lived in Morristown, Tennessee. Ward entered active duty with the United States Army's 117th Regiment from the Tennessee National Guard during World War I. On October 8, 1918, during the Meuse-Argonne Offensive, Ward's company was stopped near Estrées, France by a German machine gun position. Ward and Sergeant James Ernest Karnes, deciding they had "had all they could take" of this situation, fixed bayonets, charged and captured the position. This freed their company to advance against German lines in the last major offensive of the war. Both men received the Medal of Honor for extraordinary heroism in this action.

Calvin Ward died on December 15, 1967, and is buried in Glenwood Cemetery, Bristol, Sullivan County, Tennessee.

Medals
Military records from the United States, United Kingdom, France, Italy, and Portugal attribute the following medals to Calvin John Ward:

Medal of Honor,
British Distinguished Conduct Medal 31JAN1919,
French Croix de Guerre w/ Palm 13APR1919,
French Medaille Militaire 5MAY1919,
Montenegran Medaille de Bravoure w/ Palm 25JUN1919,
Portuguese Cruz de Gurra 3rd Class 6DEC1921,
Italian Croce di Guerra 9DEC1921,
Belgian Decoration,
Russian Decoration

Medal of Honor Citation
Rank and organization: Private, U.S. Army, Company D, 117th Infantry, 30th Division. Place and date: At Estrees, France; October 8, 1918. Entered service at: Morristown, Tennessee. Born: October 30, 1898; Greene County, Tennessee. General Orders: War Department, General Orders No. 16 (January 22, 1919).

Citation:

During an advance, Pvt. Ward's company was held up by a machinegun, which was enfilading the line. Accompanied by a noncommissioned officer, he advanced against this post and succeeded in reducing the nest by killing three and capturing seven of the enemy and their guns.

Military Awards 
Ward's military decorations and awards include:

See also

List of Medal of Honor recipients for World War I

References

External links

1899 births
1967 deaths
United States Army personnel of World War I
United States Army Medal of Honor recipients
United States Army soldiers
People from Greene County, Tennessee
People from Morristown, Tennessee
Recipients of the Silver Star
Military personnel from Tennessee
World War I recipients of the Medal of Honor
Recipients of the Distinguished Conduct Medal
Burials in Tennessee